Abeng (stylized in all capital letters) was a weekly newspaper published in Kingston, Jamaica. It started as a response to the protests movement that emerged after the banning of African-Guyanese historian Walter Rodney from the campus of the University of the West Indies, Mona. It was published from January to October 1969.  Abeng was dedicated to the issues of Black and Caribbean consciousness awareness, and the editorial bent was severely critical of both Jamaican political parties.  

The editors included George Beckford, Robert Hill, Rupert Lewis and Trevor Munroe.

References

External links
 ABENG newspaper , digital copies at the Digital Library of the Caribbean.

1969 disestablishments in Jamaica
1969 establishments in Jamaica
Newspapers published in Jamaica
Publications disestablished in 1969
Publications established in 1969